The 2012 FIBA Europe Under-18 Championship Division B was an international basketball  competition held in Bosnia and Herzegovina in 2012.

Final ranking

1.  Bosnia and Herzegovina

2.  Czech Republic

3.  England

4.  Finland

5.  Montenegro

6.  Estonia

7.  Israel

8.  Belgium

9.  Netherlands

10.  Portugal

11.  Hungary

12.  Austria

13.  Iceland

14.  Sweden

15.  Romania

16.  Slovakia

17.  Georgia

18.  Belarus

19.  Luxembourg

20.  Norway

21.  Switzerland

22.  Scotland

Awards

External links
FIBA Archive

FIBA U18 European Championship Division B
2012–13 in European basketball
2012–13 in Bosnia and Herzegovina basketball
International youth basketball competitions hosted by Bosnia and Herzegovina